The 1998 Indonesia Open in badminton was held in Jakarta, from October 26 to November 1, 1998. It was a four-star tournament with the prize money of US$120,000.

Venue
Istora Senayan

Final results

References
Smash: 1998 Indonesian Open

External links
 Tournament Link

Indonesia Open (badminton)
Indonesia
Sports competitions in Jakarta
1998 in Indonesian sport